Alexander Geoffrey Cole-Hamilton (born 22 July 1977) is a Scottish politician who has served as Leader of the Scottish Liberal Democrats since 2021 and the Member of the Scottish Parliament (MSP) for the Edinburgh Western constituency since 2016.

Early life
Cole-Hamilton was born in Hertfordshire, England, the son of inorganic chemist Dr David John Cole-Hamilton, FRSE, FRSC, a lecturer at the University of Liverpool and speech therapist and marine archaeological academic Elizabeth Ann, daughter of RCNVR officer and government employee Bruce Lloyd Brown (1914-2002), of Victoria, British Columbia, Canada, grandson of Alexander Brown, co-founder of Christie, Brown and Company, the largest Canadian manufacturer of biscuits. His great-grandfather Richard Cole-Hamilton was Archdeacon of Brecon from 1947 to 1955. The Cole-Hamiltons descend from Arthur Cole-Hamilton, younger son of the Irish politician John Cole, 1st Baron Mountflorence, of Florence Court, whose eldest son and heir, William, was created Earl of Enniskillen. Relatives include Anni Cole-Hamilton, founder of the private Moray Firth School, and Air Vice Marshal John Cole-Hamilton. Cole-Hamilton's family moved from Lancashire to Scotland when he was 8 years old. After attending Madras College, a state school in St Andrews, he graduated from the University of Aberdeen with a degree in politics and international relations. There, he was President of the Students' Representative Council from 1999 until 2000, where he was actively involved in negotiations with coalition ministers to abolish tuition fees in Scotland.

On leaving Aberdeen in 2000, he was appointed to the role of constituency organiser in the Liberal Democrat held constituency of Edinburgh West. He went on to work for the Liberal Democrats in the Scottish Parliament until late 2003 at which point he was appointed as a policy and communications officer in the Children’s voluntary sector, where he worked for various organisations until his election in 2016. During this time he was a Director of and then latterly the Convener of "Together (Scottish Alliance for Children's Rights)".

Cole-Hamilton won several Scottish and UK awards with other colleagues in the informal 'Coalition for Continuing Care' for their successful campaign to change the age of leaving care in Scotland from 18 to 21.

Throughout his career, up to his election, Cole-Hamilton volunteered as a youth worker for a range of organisations.

Political career

Cole-Hamilton stood in several constituencies unsuccessfully as a Lib Dem candidate: at the 2003 Scottish Parliament election for the Kirkcaldy constituency; at the 2005 general election for Kirkcaldy and Cowdenbeath; in 2007 for Stirling and in 2011 for Edinburgh Central.

Following the 2015 general election, Deputy Prime Minister and Liberal Democrat Leader Nick Clegg quoted Cole-Hamilton when delivering his resignation speech. He referred to the 2011 Scottish Parliament election, saying "In 2011 after a night of disappointing election results for our party in Edinburgh, Alex Cole-Hamilton said this: if his defeat was part-payment for the ending of child detention, then he accepted it with all his heart. Those words revealed a selfless dignity which is very rare in politics, but common amongst Liberal Democrats."

In May 2016, Cole-Hamilton was elected to the Scottish Parliament for the Edinburgh Western constituency. After the election, he was made Scottish Liberal Democrat spokesperson for Health. Cole-Hamilton's 2016 electoral expenses were investigated in June of the following year, according to the Edinburgh Evening News: "Mr Cole-Hamilton recorded the highest election costs of any Edinburgh candidate, spending £32,549 on his campaign while his rival for the Edinburgh Western seat, SNP candidate Tony Giugliano, spent £18,593." While Cole-Hamilton was cleared of any wrongdoing, the party was fined for failing to file an accurate spending return on its national spending return. He received the 'one to watch' award at the Herald – Scottish Politician of the Year Awards in August 2016.

In 2018, Cole-Hamilton successfully persuaded the Scottish Government to reverse a planned funding cut to HIV Scotland that would have sunk that organisation. In 2020, during parliamentary deliberation of the first Coronavirus Act, Cole-Hamilton introduced amendments which forced a government U-turn on their proposals to abolish jury trials in Scotland for the duration of the emergency.

From 2019 until March 2021, he was a member of the Committee on the Scottish Government Handling of Harassment Complaints against the former First Minister, Alex Salmond.

In February 2021, Cole-Hamilton was forced to apologise after having been seen swearing at Minister for Children and Young People Maree Todd during an online committee hearing. He wrote Todd a letter of apology, as well as publicly apologising in the Holyrood Chamber the week after. 

At the 2021 Scottish Parliament election, Cole-Hamilton received 25,578 votes, the highest number of votes ever cast for a single candidate in the Scottish Parliament election. He beat the runner-up, SNP candidate Sarah Masson, by 9,885 votes. 

On 27 July 2021, Cole-Hamilton announced his intention to stand in the upcoming Scottish Liberal Democrats leadership election to replace Willie Rennie. He won the election unopposed on 20 August 2021 and took office the same day. He led the party into the 2022 local elections, which saw an increase of 20 councillors to 87, and increased vote share to 8.7%.

He has prioritised campaigning on children's mental health, long covid, tackling the climate crisis and supporting Ukrainian refugees. He was sanctioned by the Kremlin in August 2022 following his public criticism of the Russian invasion of Ukraine, and his efforts to highlight Russian influence in Scotland.

Personal life
Cole-Hamilton is married to Gillian, a teacher and Liberal Democrat candidate. They have three children. In 2019, he resuscitated his daughter after she swallowed a 50c Euro coin. He used the publicity around this to raise awareness of the importance of infant first aid and organised several first aid training events in his constituency.

His relative John Cole-Hamilton was Provost of Kilwinning from 1940 until 1947, Deputy Lord Lieutenant for the County of Ayr in 1951, and Chairman of the Central Ayrshire Conservative Party when that constituency was formed, and Richard Cole-Hamilton, former chief executive of the Clydesdale Bank.

He ranked 27 out of 50 on the Top 50 Lib Dems of 2020 list.

References

External links 
 
 Alex Cole-Hamilton MSP profile at the site of Scottish Liberal Democrats

1977 births
Living people
Alumni of the University of Aberdeen
Liberal Democrat MSPs
Members of the Scottish Parliament 2016–2021
Members of the Scottish Parliament 2021–2026
Members of the Scottish Parliament for Edinburgh constituencies
People educated at Madras College